Ryazanovka is a rural locality (a village) and the administrative centre of Ryazanovsky Selsoviet, Sterlitamaksky District, Bashkortostan, Russia. The population was 616 as of 2010. There are 2 streets.

Geography 
Ryazanovka is located 12 km northwest of Sterlitamak (the district's administrative centre) by road. Marshanovka is the nearest rural locality.

References 

Rural localities in Sterlitamaksky District